Aughton Park railway station is a railway station that serves the village of Aughton, Lancashire, England, on the Ormskirk branch of the Northern Line of the Merseyrail network 11½ miles (19 km) north east of Liverpool Central. During the 2020/21 and 2021/22 periods, Aughton Park was the least used station on the Merseyrail Network.

History
The station is below ground level built into a cutting. Opened by the Lancashire and Yorkshire Railway, Aughton Park Station was originally coupled with a freight siding, Crook's Sand Siding, which serviced two nearby quarries. The station became part of the London, Midland and Scottish Railway during the Grouping of 1923. The line then passed on to the London Midland Region of British Railways on nationalisation in 1948.

When sectorisation was introduced, the station was served by Regional Railways on behalf of the Merseyside PTE until the privatisation of British Railways.

Facilities
The station is staffed throughout the day (like all Merseytravel stations), with the ticket office open from start of service until the last train has called throughout the week. There are shelters on both platforms and a pay phone on platform 1. Train running information is provided by automated announcements and digital display screens. No step-free access to either platform is available.

Services
Trains operate every 15 minutes on Monday to Saturday daytimes between Ormskirk and Liverpool Central, and every 30 minutes at other times (evenings and Sundays).

References

Bibliography

 
 
 
 Station on navigable O.S. map

External links

Railway stations in the Borough of West Lancashire
DfT Category E stations
Former Lancashire and Yorkshire Railway stations
Railway stations in Great Britain opened in 1907
Railway stations served by Merseyrail
1907 establishments in England